Radio Olive 106.3  is Hindi FM station to be aired from the State of Qatar. The FM station broadcasts 24/7 entertainment, songs and public awareness information to the diaspora in Qatar.

Information 
Radio Olive 106.3  FM has created a milestone in the history of this nation by being the first private Hindi FM station to be aired from the State of Qatar. The FM is part of the Qatar's Radio Network Olive Suno Radio Network. Radio Olive caters to over 11,00,000 Hindi speaking expatriates living in Qatar.

Promoters 
 Ameer Ali Paruvally 
 Krishnakumar
 Satheesh Pillai

Programming

Radio Olive 106.3 has a standard program structure across Qatar with station wise programming. The content at each station produced keeping in mind the hyper local flavors of particular regions.

Station locations
At present Radio Olive stations are at:

Qatar Radio Olive 106.3, Al Ezz tower 3, Al Safiliya Street,
Doha

References

External links
 The official website

Radio stations in Qatar
Radio stations established in 2017